Cypriot dialect may refer to:

Living dialects
 Cypriot Arabic
 Cypriot Greek
 Cypriot Turkish

Extinct dialects
 Arcadocypriot
 Eteocypriot